Omuntele Constituency is an electoral constituency in the Oshikoto Region on the northern part of Namibia. It had 21,884 inhabitants in 2004 and 9,854 registered voters . The district capital is the settlement of Omuntele.

The constituency is situated in the northwest part of Oshikoto about 60 km southeast of Ondangwa. The constituency is currently led by Sakeus 'Sacky' Nangula, councillor for SWAPO. It is dominated by Oshiwambo speaking people and a small number San people. People in the area survive in cultivating crops. Mahangu is the principal crop in the area.

History
The area was established by Silvanus Nyambali Nehale, son of Ondonga Chief Nehale Mpingana. During the Namibian War of Independence many people from this area went into exile to Angola and took up arms there. However, between 1976 and 1980 combatants of the People's Liberation Army of Namibia (PLAN) lived at Omuntele as civilians as part of a covert reconnaissance operation. There were a number of battles in and around Omuntele like the one at Oshalongo in which Commander Max Nekongo was seriously injured. Nekongo is currently the councillor of Onayena Constituency.

Politics
Omuntele constituency is traditionally a stronghold of the South West Africa People's Organization (SWAPO) party.  In the 2009 general election, incumbent President and SWAPO candidate Hifikepunye Pohamba received 98% of the votes for President. 

In the 2015 local and regional elections the SWAPO candidate Sakeus Nangula won uncontested and remained councillor after no opposition party nominated a candidate. He was re-elected with  3,869 votes in the 2020 regional election. The only opposition candidate, Erkki Shivute of the Independent Patriots for Change (IPC), a party formed in August 2020, obtained 1,659 votes.

See also
 Administrative divisions of Namibia

References

Constituencies of Oshikoto Region
States and territories established in 1992
1992 establishments in Namibia